Ambrose Gaines "Uncle Am" Stuart (1853–1926) was an American Old-time fiddle player.  After winning various fiddle contests across the Southern Appalachian region in the late 19th and early 20th centuries, Stuart made several recordings in June 1924 that would later prove influential in the development of early Country music.

Stuart was born near Morristown, Tennessee in 1853.  He learned to play fiddle at a young age, picking up a number of tunes from Civil War soldiers who passed through the area in the 1860s, and learning techniques while wandering through post-Civil War African-American camps.  His later style represented a fusion of Civil War tunes and Appalachian folk music.  By the time he had gained regional fame as a fiddle player in the early 1900s, Stuart was working as a safe and vault salesman.

Noting the success of the Okeh recordings of Fiddlin' John Carson in 1923, Vocalion Records sought to recruit its own Southern mountain musicians, and the following year invited several Southern Appalachian musicians to New York to record, among them Uncle Am Stuart.  The 14 sides Stuart recorded included the first known recordings of the Appalachian folk songs Cumberland Gap and "Forked Deer," early renditions of the oft-played fiddle tunes "Grey Eagle" and "Old Granny Rattletrap," and early renderings of later bluegrass staples "Sallie Gooden" and "Old Liza Jane."

In 1925, Stuart attended the Fiddlers' Convention in Mountain City, Tennessee, where he competed in a now-legendary fiddle contest against rival fiddlers such as Charlie Bowman, G. B. Grayson, Dudley Vance, and Fiddlin' John Carson.  Accounts vary as to the contest's results, although at least one account placed Stuart in third place.  In the early 1930s, Stuart's Vocalion recordings were among those a young Roy Acuff sought to emulate while learning to play the fiddle.

References

External links
 

Musicians from Tennessee
Southern old-time fiddlers
People from Morristown, Tennessee
Vocalion Records artists
1853 births
1926 deaths
Appalachian music